The 2004 Chevy Rock and Roll 400 was the 26th stock car race of the 2004 NASCAR Nextel Cup Series season, the final race of the 2004 NASCAR regular season, and the 47th iteration of the event. The race was held on Saturday, September 11, 2004, before a crowd of 110,000 in Richmond, Virginia, at Richmond International Raceway, a 0.75 miles (1.21 km) D-shaped oval. The race took the scheduled 400 laps to complete. At race's end, Jeremy Mayfield of Evernham Motorsports would pass a fuel-ailing Kurt Busch with 8 to go and take home a clutch win to lock himself into the 2004 Chase for the Nextel Cup. The race was Mayfield's fourth career NASCAR Nextel Cup Series win and his first and only win of the season. To fill out the podium, Dale Earnhardt Jr. of Dale Earnhardt, Inc. and Jeff Gordon of Hendrick Motorsports would finish second and third, respectively.

The ten drivers to make it into the inaugural Chase for the Nextel Cup were Jeff Gordon, Jimmie Johnson, Dale Earnhardt Jr., Tony Stewart, Matt Kenseth, Elliott Sadler, Kurt Busch, Mark Martin, Jeremy Mayfield, and Ryan Newman.

Background 

Richmond International Raceway (RIR) is a 3/4-mile (1.2 km), D-shaped, asphalt race track located just outside Richmond, Virginia in Henrico County. It hosts the Monster Energy NASCAR Cup Series and Xfinity Series. Known as "America's premier short track", it formerly hosted a NASCAR Camping World Truck Series race, an IndyCar Series race, and two USAC sprint car races.

Entry list 

*Withdrew.

Practice

First practice 
The first practice session was held on Friday, September 10, at 11:20 AM EST, and would last for two hours.

Second and final practice 
The second and final practice session, sometimes referred to as Happy Hour, was held on Friday, September 10, at 6:00 PM EST, and would last for one hour and 15 minutes.

Qualifying 
Qualifying was held on Friday, September 10, at 3:10 PM EST. Each driver would have two laps to set a fastest time; the fastest of the two would count as their official qualifying lap. Positions 1-38 would be decided on time, while positions 39-43 would be based on provisionals. Four spots are awarded by the use of provisionals based on owner's points. The fifth is awarded to a past champion who has not otherwise qualified for the race. If no past champ needs the provisional, the next team in the owner points will be awarded a provisional.

Nine drivers would fail to qualify: Johnny Sauter, Tony Raines, Kevin Lepage, Greg Sacks, Hermie Sadler, Brad Teague, Ryan McGlynn, Morgan Shepherd, and Carl Long.

Full qualifying results

Race results

References 

2004 NASCAR Nextel Cup Series
NASCAR races at Richmond Raceway
September 2004 sports events in the United States
2004 in sports in Virginia